Martin Bragg Caroe FSA (15 November 1933 − 19 November 1999) was an English conservation architect, and partner in Caroe & Partners from 1963 until his death.

Biography 
Caroe was born on 15 November 1933 was the son of the architect Alban Caroe and Gwendolen Mary (née Bragg), daughter of Sir William Henry Bragg. He was educated at Amesbury School, Winchester College and Trinity College, Cambridge (BA, 1957). He married Mary Elizabeth Roskill in 1962 and they had three daughters and two sons:

Rebecca Elizabeth Caroe (born 14 July 1965, in Camberwell)
William Desborough Caroe (6 May 1967, in Camberwell − 17 September 1974, in Surrey (road traffic accident))
Oliver Bragg Caroe (born 24 August 1968, in Vann, Hambledon
 Ruth Gwendolen Caroe (born 20 September 1972, in Vann, Hambledon)
 Emily Grace Mary Caroe (born 24 August 1976, in Vann, Hambledon)

References

External links 
 https://www.independent.co.uk/arts-entertainment/obituary-martin-caroe-1131212.html
 https://web.archive.org/web/20110927070546/http://www.sal.org.uk/obituaries/Obituary%20archive/martin-caroe

1933 births
1999 deaths
People educated at Winchester College
Alumni of Trinity College, Cambridge
Architects from Surrey